Skylab & Tragtenberg, Vol. 3 is a collaborative album between Brazilian musicians Rogério Skylab and Lívio Tragtenberg. The final installment of the Skylab & Tragtenberg trilogy, it was self-released on July 11, 2018, and is available for digital download/streaming on Deezer, the iTunes Store and Spotify, as well as on Skylab's official website. The track "Bocetinha de Cocô" previously appeared as a teaser on Skylab's EP Skylab, released the year prior, and was uploaded separately as a single on Skylab's YouTube channel on November 5, 2017.

The lyrics to "Travesti" were taken from an excerpt of Décio Pignatari's poem "O Lobisomem" ("The Werewolf").

Track listing

Personnel
 Rogério Skylab – vocals, production
  – vocals (track 12)
 Lívio Tragtenberg – bass clarinet, keyboards, programming, mixing, arrangements
 Thiago Martins – electric guitar, classical guitar
 Daniel Nakamura – mastering
 Carlos Mancuso – cover art

References

2018 albums
Collaborative albums
Rogério Skylab albums
Self-released albums
Sequel albums
Albums free for download by copyright owner